In the history of Ireland, the Penal Laws was a series of laws imposed in an attempt to force Irish Catholics and  to lesser extent Protestant dissenter planters and Quakers to accept the established Church of Ireland. These laws notably included the Education Act 1695, the Banishment Act 1697, the Registration Act 1704, the Popery Acts 1704 and 1709, and the Disenfranchising Act 1728. The majority of the penal laws were removed in the period 1778–1793 with the last of them of any significance being removed in 1829. Notwithstanding those previous enactments, the Government of Ireland Act 1920 (coming into force during the Irish War of Independence) contained an all-purpose provision in section 5 removing any that might technically still then be in existence.

Stuart and Cromwellian rule

The Penal Laws were, according to Edmund Burke, "a machine of wise and elaborate contrivance, as well fitted for the oppression, impoverishment and degradation of a people, and the debasement in them of human nature itself, as ever proceeded from the perverted ingenuity of man." Burke long counselled kinder relations by London with its American and Irish cousins, fearing that the punitive spirit fostered by the British was destroying English character, and would spur violent revolt.

Initially, the dual monarchs of England and Ireland were cautious about applying the Penal Laws to Ireland because they needed the support of the Catholic upper classes to put down the Gaelic Irish rebellion in the Nine Years War (1594–1603). In addition, a significant section of the Catholic aristocracy was composed of Old English, who had traditionally been loyal to English rule in Ireland. However, the ascent of James VI of Scotland to both the English and Irish thrones as James I in 1603 and the eventual victory in the Nine Years War saw a series of coercive new laws put into force. In 1605 the 'Gunpowder Plot' was planned by a group of English Catholics, who were disappointed in their hopes that James would relieve laws against Catholics. This provided a further impetus and justification for restrictive laws on Catholics in Ireland, Scotland and England. In 1607 the Flight of the Earls seeking Catholic help in Europe for a further revolt set the scene for a wholesale Plantation of Ulster by the Lowland Scots and Northern English.

From 1607, Catholics were barred from holding public office or serving in the Irish Army. This meant that the Irish Privy Council and the Lords Justice who, along with the Lord Deputy of Ireland, constituted the government of the country, would in future be Anglicans. In 1613, the constituencies of the Irish House of Commons were altered to give plantation settlers a majority. In addition, Catholics in all three Kingdoms had to pay 'recusant fines' for non-attendance at Anglican services. Catholic churches were transferred to the Anglican Church of Ireland. Catholic services, however, were generally tacitly tolerated as long as they were conducted in private. Catholic priests were also tolerated, but bishops were forced to operate clandestinely. In 1634 the issue of the "Graces" arose; generous taxation for Charles I (whose Queen Henrietta Maria was Catholic) was supported by Irish Catholic landlords on the understanding that the laws would be reformed, but once the tax was passed, Charles' viceroy refused two of the 51 Graces, and subsequent bills were blocked by the Catholic majority in the Irish House of Lords.

Catholic resentment was a factor in starting the Irish Rebellion of 1641 and the establishment of Confederate Ireland from 1642 with Papal support, that was eventually put down in the Cromwellian conquest of Ireland in 1649–53. The Act of Settlement of 1652 barred Catholics from membership of Parliament and the major landholders had most of their lands confiscated under the Adventurers Act. They were also banned from living in towns for a short period. Catholic clergy were expelled from the country and were liable to instant execution when found. Many recusants had to worship in secret at gathering places (such as Mass rocks) in the countryside. In 1666 forty nine Catholics from hiding places in the woods in county Roscommon signed a letter in support of the Pope and protesting the loss of their 'due liberties'. Seventeen Catholic martyrs from this period were beatified in 1992.

1660–1693
Much of this legislation was rescinded after the Restoration in Ireland by Charles II (1660–1685), under the Declaration of Breda in 1660, in terms of worship and property-owning, but also the first Test Act became law from 1673. Louis XIV of France increased Protestant paranoia in Europe when he expelled the Huguenots from France in 1685, and took his policy from the hard-line Bishop Bossuet. Following the flight from England to Ireland by James II caused by the English Glorious Revolution in 1688, the decisions of the Catholic-majority Patriot Parliament of 1688–9 in Dublin included a complete repeal of the 1660s land settlements. These were reversed after the largely Roman Catholic Jacobites that sided with King James then lost the Williamite war in Ireland in 1689–91. His opponents William III and Mary II were grandchildren of King Charles I, and so the war ultimately decided whether Catholic or Protestant Stuarts would reign.

The war ended with the Treaty of Limerick agreed by Sarsfield and Ginkel in October 1691. This provided in article 1 that:
The Roman Catholics of this kingdom shall enjoy such privileges in the exercise of their religion as are consistent with the laws of Ireland, or as they did enjoy in the reign of king Charles the second: and their majesties, as soon as their affairs will permit them to summon a parliament in this kingdom, will endeavour to procure the said Roman Catholics such farther security in that particular, as may preserve them from any disturbance upon the account of their said religion.

The quid pro quo to attain these privileges involved swearing an oath of loyalty to William and Mary. Many Catholics found this oath repugnant when the Papacy started to support the Jacobites in 1693. A small number of Catholic landlords had sworn this loyalty oath in 1691–3 and their families remained protected. Previous Jacobite garrison surrenders, particularly the agreement at Galway earlier in 1691, specifically provided that the Catholic gentry of counties Galway and Mayo were protected from the property restrictions, though they would be excluded from direct involvement in politics.

Articles 2 and 9 required that:

At the European level, this war was a part of the War of the Grand Alliance, in which the Holy See supported William III's alliance against France, and on the news of the Battle of the Boyne a Te Deum was sung in thanksgiving at the Vatican. But from 1693 the Papacy changed its policy and supported James against William, and William's policy also moved from a degree of toleration for Catholics to greater hostility. By then, King James was based in France at Saint Germain, and was supported politically and financially by Louis XIV, the long-standing enemy of William and Mary. Religion eventually became an issue in defining a notable family's loyalty to the crown.

Ascendancy rule 1691–1778
With the defeat of Catholic attempts to regain power and lands in Ireland, a ruling class which became known later as the Protestant Ascendancy sought to ensure dominance with the passing of a number of laws to restrict the religious, political and economic activities of Catholics and Protestant Dissenters. Harsher laws were introduced for political reasons during the long War of the Spanish Succession that ended in 1714. James Stuart, the son of James II, the "Old Pretender", was recognised by the Holy See as the legitimate King of Great Britain and Ireland until his death in 1766, and Catholics were obliged to support him. He also approved the appointments of all the Irish Catholic hierarchy, who were drawn from his most fervent supporters. These aspects provided the political basis for the new laws passed for several decades after 1695. Interdicts faced by Catholics and Dissenters under the Penal Laws were:

 Exclusion of Catholics from most public offices (since 1607), Presbyterians were also barred from public office from 1707.
 Ban on intermarriage with Protestants; repealed 1778
 Presbyterian marriages were not legally recognised by the state
 Catholics barred from holding firearms or serving in the armed forces (rescinded by Militia Act of 1793)
 Bar from membership in either the Parliament of Ireland or the Parliament of England from 1652; rescinded 1662–1691; renewed 1691–1829, applying to the successive parliaments of England (to 1707), Great Britain (1707 to 1800), and the United Kingdom of Great Britain and Ireland (1800 to 1829).
 Disenfranchising Act 1728, exclusion from voting until 1793;
 Exclusion from the legal professions and the judiciary; repealed (respectively) 1793 and 1829.
 Education Act 1695 – ban on foreign education; repealed 1782.
 Bar to Catholics and Protestant Dissenters entering Trinity College Dublin; repealed 1793.
 On a death by a Catholic, his legatee could benefit by conversion to the Church of Ireland;
 Popery Act – Catholic inheritances of land were to be equally subdivided between all an owner's sons with the exception that if the eldest son and heir converted to Protestantism that he would become the one and only tenant of estate and portions for other children not to exceed one third of the estate. This "Gavelkind" system had previously been abolished by 1600.
 Ban on converting from Protestantism to Roman Catholicism on pain of Praemunire: forfeiting all property estates and legacy to the monarch of the time and remaining in prison at the monarch's pleasure.  In addition, forfeiting the monarch's protection.  No injury however atrocious could have any action brought against it or any reparation for such.
 Ban on Catholics buying land under a lease of more than 31 years; repealed 1778.
 Ban on custody of orphans being granted to Catholics on pain of a £500 fine that was to be donated to the Blue Coat hospital in Dublin.
 Ban on Catholics inheriting Protestant land
 Prohibition on Catholics owning a horse valued at over £5 (to keep horses suitable for military activity out of the majority's hands)
 Roman Catholic lay priests had to register to preach under the Registration Act 1704, but seminary priests and Bishops were not able to do so until 1778. 
 When allowed, new Catholic churches were to be built from wood, not stone, and away from main roads.
 'No person of the popish religion shall publicly or in private houses teach school, or instruct youth in learning within this realm' upon pain of a £20 fine and three months in prison for every such offence. Repealed in 1782.
Any and all rewards not paid by the crown for alerting authorities of offences to be levied upon the Catholic populace within parish and county.

Historians disagree on how rigorously these laws were enforced. The consensus view is that enforcement depended on the attitudes of local magistrates bringing or hearing particular cases; some of whom were rigorous, others more liberal.

The Catholic Committees
From 1758, before the death of the Old Pretender, who styled himself James III, ad-hoc groups of the remaining Catholic nobility and merchants worked towards repeal of the penal laws and an accommodation within the Hanoverian system. These were based locally on county lines. An earlier attempt in 1727 had met with strong opposition from the Jacobite movement, which resisted any negotiations with the Hanoverians, being usurpers. By 1760 eminent Catholics such as Lord Trimlestown, Lord Kenmare and Charles O'Conor of Belanagare persuaded the more liberal Protestants that they presented no political threat, and that reforms must follow. Events abroad in the 1760s, such as the outcome of the Seven Years' War, the death of the Old Pretender (1766), the emerging "Age of Enlightenment", and the Suppression of the Society of Jesus by Europe's Catholic monarchs, all seemed to confirm their position. The committees' work was supported in London by Edmund Burke, who had drafted a speech on reform given in 1762, and "in 1764 he had prepared a long draft paper on the penal laws" that was not published, but was influential and widely circulated at Westminster.

Gradual reform and emancipation 1778–1869
On the death of the Old Pretender in January 1766, the Holy See recognised the Hanoverian dynasty as legitimate, and so the main political basis for the laws was removed and the slow process of Catholic emancipation began, with the repeal of some of the Penal Laws by the Catholic Relief Acts of 1771, 1778 and 1793. However, the long drawn-out pace of reform ensured that the question of religious discrimination dominated Irish life and was a constant source of division. In a show of goodwill, John Carpenter, the Catholic Archbishop of Dublin, formally an unlawful position, was invited to join the Royal Dublin Society in 1773.

Visitors from abroad such as Arthur Young in the late 1770s also deplored the Penal laws as being contrary to the spirit of the Age of Enlightenment, and illogical as they were unenforced. In his Tour in Ireland (1780), that was sponsored by many landlords, Young mentioned the laws twice:
.. the cruel laws against the Roman Catholics of this country, remain the marks of illiberal barbarism. Why should not the industrious man have a spur to his industry, whatever be his religion..?
Talking with Chief Baron Foster, Young commented:
In conversation on the Popery laws, I expressed my surprise at their severity; he said they were severe in the letter, but never executed.  .. His Lordship did justice to the merits of the Roman Catholics, by observing that they were in general a very sober, honest and industrious people. This .. brought to my mind an admirable expression of Mr Burke's in the English House of Commons: Connivance is the relaxation of slavery, not the definition of Liberty.

An Irish Act of 1774 allowed any subject of George III "of whatever persuasion to testify their allegiance to him". The Quebec Act of 1774 was an encouragement outside Ireland, with the London parliament restoring religious rights in the main part of Canada, followed in Britain and Ireland by the Catholic Relief Act 1778. Carlow College was established in 1782.

From 1782 reformist Irish Protestant politicians like Henry Grattan, JP Curran, William Ponsonby and Frederick Hervey, 4th Earl of Bristol (a Protestant bishop), added their voices in support. In the English House of Commons Edmund Burke also helped, but was faced with anti-Catholic sentiment which exploded in the Gordon Riots of 1780. Another reform Act of 1782 sponsored by Luke Gardiner removed the remaining limits on Catholics buying land and some petty restrictions such as owning a horse worth less than £5.

In 1792 William FitzGerald, 2nd Duke of Leinster, the eldest brother of Lord Edward Fitzgerald, founded the Association of the Friends of Liberty whose program sought Catholic members in the Irish House of Commons. They could not persuade most Protestant MPs to effect a bigger change than the Roman Catholic Relief Act 1793, where Catholics were now allowed to buy freehold land, to become grand jurors and barristers, to study at Trinity College Dublin, and to vote if they held property with a rental value of at least £2 a year (the forty-shilling freeholders). A majority of Irish MPs were still reluctant to reform, and the Roman Catholic Relief Act 1793 had to be encouraged by the British government, that had already passed the Roman Catholic Relief Act 1791.

Opposition to Catholic Relief ensured that when relief was granted it was often accompanied by what were seen to be unpleasant concessions to the system. Relief in 1793 was accompanied by a widely unpopular Militia Act which removed the ban on Catholics holding firearms to allow for their conscription into the militia, but not their admittance into the officer ranks. However, wealthier Catholics did not oppose this as it was further proof of their gradual inclusion into the establishment. An example was Daniel O'Connell who briefly joined the militia unit formed at the King's Inns in the late 1790s. Pitt also encouraged a short-lived Catholic Irish Brigade.

France declared war on Britain and Ireland in February 1793 and the war took priority over further reliefs. The French government opposed the Holy See from 1790. Irish Catholic priests were trained in France, Belgium, and Spain, so the Prime Minister Pitt funded the establishment of St. Patrick's seminary in Maynooth in 1795. The French republican policies of Dechristianization in 1790–1801 were often similar to Cromwell's anti-Catholic policies in Ireland in the 1650s. The Presbyterian Church was granted the Regium Donum. In 1795 the new viceroy the earl of Fitzwilliam proposed full political emancipation, as suggested by Henry Grattan, and a prelude to proposals for Parliamentary union. He was removed within weeks by the conservatives in the Irish administration.

Many reformers despaired of peaceful change, particularly in the lack of tithe reform, and this led on to instances of Catholic support for the abortive 1798 rebellion. During the rebellion the Irish Catholic bishops supported the government line. The subsequent passing of the Act of Union of 1801 was intended to include Catholic emancipation, as power was moved from the hands of the Protestant Ascendancy to the London Parliament. This was agreed by most of the British cabinet, including William Pitt, and they resigned when it was not effected. The personal opposition of George III ensured that no change would be forthcoming during his reign.

Emancipation
The political argument for emancipation to allow Catholic MPs to sit in parliament continued after the 1801 Act of Union, supported by liberal MPs such as Henry Grattan. Division arose over the "veto", the issue whether the government could, or could not, veto the appointment of a bishop where he was approved by the Pope. In May 1823, Daniel O'Connell launched the Catholic Association and campaigned for Catholic emancipation which was largely achieved in the Act of 1829, primarily benefitting the middle classes. While this was seen as a late and overdue reform by Irish Catholics, Dissenters had only just achieved the same status following the Sacramental Test Act 1828, Jewish MPs were barred until 1858 and atheists until 1886.

The Act also allowed for Catholic judges and senior civil servants and state officials to be appointed. As with the election of MPs, those who benefited were the better educated and richer Catholics. The same class took advantage of the reform of town and city corporations in the Municipal Corporations (Ireland) Act 1840 and took part in local government. But for the majority of Irish Catholics living in the countryside, the cost of the tithing system had always been the main cause of complaint.

Tithe reform

The obligation by Catholics and other religious groups to pay tithes to the Protestant Church remained until its disestablishment by the Irish Church Act 1869 and Catholic Emancipation was quickly followed by a period of violent resistance known as the Tithe War. From 1840 tithes were no longer payable by tenants but by their landlords, who were allowed to increase rents to make up the difference. The Catholic Church became resurgent from the 1840s, uniting with the Protestant churches to oppose the integration of students of differing religion in the new primary or 'National' schools, and in the 1850s a debate arose over whether some proposed universities should be mixed or just for Catholics.

Government of Ireland Act 1920
Section 5(2) of the Government of Ireland Act 1920 stated:
Any existing enactment by which any penalty, disadvantage, or disability is imposed on account of religious belief or on a member of any religious order as such shall ... cease to have effect in Ireland.

This did not affect the Act of Settlement 1701, which prohibited those married to Catholics from succeeding to the throne; these were later repealed by the Succession to the Crown Act 2013 (between 1920 and 2013 there was no Catholic heir to the throne).

As a result of sections 5(2) and 37(1) of the 1920 Act, Catholics once again became eligible to occupy the office of Lord Lieutenant of Ireland, the British monarch's representative in Ireland. Within months of the enactment of this legislation, Viscount FitzAlan of Derwent became in April 1921 the first Catholic Lord Lieutenant of Ireland since the penal laws forbade such appointments in 1685. Because of the establishment of the Irish Free State in 1922 and the altered constitutional relationship between Ireland and the United Kingdom, FitzAlan was also the last Lord Lieutenant of Ireland.

Mentioned into the 20th century
The memory of the Penal laws remained as a strongly resonant cultural element in Irish Catholicism long after their reform, and they were seen as a social and legal nadir from which the bulk of the Irish population had eventually escaped.

In May 1920, Seán T. O'Kelly sent a memorandum to Pope Benedict XV which included:

In 1971, responding to news of an importation of contraceptive devices from Northern Ireland that could not be sold in the Republic, Thomas Ryan, Bishop of Clonfert, said that "never before, and certainly not since penal times was the Catholic heritage of Ireland subjected to so many insidious onslaughts on the pretext of conscience, civil rights and women's liberation."

Notes

Citations

Bibliography

External links
 
 
 
Laws in Ireland for the suppression of Popery 
 Bills 1692–1800 with subject "Popery" Irish Legislation Database

 
History of Christianity in Ireland
History of Christianity in the United Kingdom
Christianity and law in the 17th century
Anti-Catholicism in Ireland
Legal history of Ireland
Social history of Ireland
Religion in the British Empire